Michał Świstak  (born 1 June 1977 in Kraków) is a Polish defender who plays for Polish club Puszcza Niepołomice.

External links
 

1977 births
Living people
Garbarnia Kraków players
Proszowianka Proszowice players
Hutnik Nowa Huta players
MKS Cracovia (football) players
Górnik Wieliczka players
Puszcza Niepołomice players
Polish footballers
Footballers from Kraków
Association football defenders